Frances Margaret Wodehouse, Countess of Kimberley (1 December 1884 - 4 January 1950) was an English socialite and member of the Bright Young Things. She married three times, always with members of the British aristocracy. She scandalized society when she went to live with her future second husband without waiting for her divorce to be effective.

Biography
Frances Margaret Irby was the only daughter of Lt.-Col. Leonard Howard Loyd Irby and Mary Brandling.

Since her presentation at court on 1 June 1906, presented by Lady de Blaquiere, Irby, according to the journals of the time, showed to be somewhat wild. She married three times.

On 12 December 1905, Frances Margaret Irby married Sir Morgan George Crofton, 6th Baronet (1879-1958), son of Capt. Edward Hugh Crofton and Isabel Annie Julia Miller; they divorced on 8 April 1910. They had one son, Major Morgan George Crofton (1907-1947). Irby left Crofton for James Montagu without waiting for the divorce, creating a huge scandal, since she went to live with Montagu.

On 22 October 1910 she married James Fountayne Montagu (1887-1971) of Papplewick Hall, son of James Wilson Montagu and Laura Adeline Thellusson; they divorced 1921.

On 5 May 1922 she married John Wodehouse, 3rd Earl of Kimberley, son of John Wodehouse, 2nd Earl of Kimberley and Isabel Geraldine Stracey. When they married, reporters asked the question "Can Lord Wodehouse's Love Tame His Lively Bride?" They had one son, John Wodehouse, 4th Earl of Kimberley (1924-2002).

Lady Kimberley died on 4 January 1950.

References

1884 births
1950 deaths
Wives of baronets
English socialites
Margaret
Kimberley